In statistics, economics, and finance, an index is a statistical measure of change in a representative group of individual data points. These data may be derived from any number of sources, including company performance, prices, productivity, and employment. Economic indices track economic health from different perspectives. Examples include the consumer price index, which measures changes in retail prices paid by consumers, and the cost-of-living index (COLI), which measures the relative cost of living over time. 

Influential global financial indices such as the Global Dow, and the NASDAQ Composite track the performance of selected large and powerful companies in order to evaluate and predict economic trends. 
The Dow Jones Industrial Average and the S&P 500 primarily track U.S. markets, though some legacy international companies are included. The consumer price index tracks the variation in prices for different consumer goods and services over time in a constant geographical location and is integral to calculations used to adjust salaries, bond interest rates, and tax thresholds for inflation. 

The GDP Deflator Index, or real GDP, measures the level of prices of all-new, domestically produced, final goods and services in an economy. Market performance indices include the labour market index/job index and proprietary stock market index investment instruments offered by brokerage houses.

Some indices display market variations. For example, the Economist provides a Big Mac Index that expresses the adjusted cost of a globally ubiquitous Big Mac as a percentage over or under the cost of a Big Mac in the U.S. in USD.  Such indices can be used to help forecast currency values.

Index numbers

An index number is an economic data figure reflecting price or quantity compared with a standard or base value. The base usually equals 100 and the index number is usually expressed as 100 times the ratio to the base value. For example, if a commodity costs twice as much in 1970 as it did in 1960, its index number would be 200 relative to 1960. Index numbers are used especially to compare business activity, the cost of living, and employment. They enable economists to reduce unwieldy business data into easily understood terms.

In contrast to a cost-of-living index based on the true but unknown utility function, a superlative index number is an index number that can be calculated. Thus, superlative index numbers are used to provide a fairly close approximation to the underlying cost-of-living index number in a wide range of circumstances.

Some indexes are not time series. Spatial indexes summarize real estate prices, or toxins in the environment, or availability of services, across geographic locations. Indexes may also be used to summarize comparisons between distributions of data within categories. For example, purchasing power parity comparisons of currencies are often constructed with indexes.

There is a substantial body of economic analysis concerning the construction of index numbers, desirable properties of index numbers and the relationship between index numbers and economic theory. A number indicating a change in magnitude, as of price, wage, employment, or production shifts, relative to the magnitude at a specified point usually taken as 100.

Index number problem

The index number problem is the term used by economists to describe the limitation of statistical indexing, when used as a measurement for cost-of-living increases.

For example, in the Consumer Price Index, a reference year's "market basket" is assigned an index number of 100. In 2019 if a market basket price is 55 and the basket were to double the following year, in 2020, then the index would rise to 200. This is done by performing a simple calculation: Dividing the new year market basket price by the reference year's (otherwise known as the base year) price, and subsequently multiplying the quotient by 100.

While the CPI is a conventional method to measure inflation, it doesn't express how price changes directly affect all consumer purchases of goods and services. It either understates or overstates cost-of-living increases. This is the limitation of the CPI that is described as the index number problem.

There is no theoretically ideal solution to this problem. In practice for retail price indices, the "basket of goods" is updated incrementally every few years to reflect changes. Nevertheless, the fact remains that many economic indices taken over the long term are not really like-for-like comparisons and this is an issue taken into account by researchers in economic history.

See also

 Stock market index
 List of stock market indices
 Producer price index
 Price index
 Chemical plant cost indexes
 Bureau of Labor Statistics
 Dow Jones Indexes
 Indexation
 economic indicator

References

Further reading
 Robin Marris, Economic Arithmetic, (1958).

External links

Humboldt Economic Index 
S&P Indices
Lars Kroijer

SG Index

Business terms
Economic growth
 
Economic indicators
Mathematical and quantitative methods (economics)